Expressway S12 or express road S12 (in Polish droga ekspresowa S12) is a major road in Poland which has been planned to run from Piotrków Trybunalski, through Radom, Lublin and Chełm, to the border crossing with Ukraine at Dorohusk. As of Summer 2018 the portion open to traffic runs from Puławy to Lublin.

Sections of the Expressway 
 Puławy-Lublin-Piaski section, part of it co-signed with expressway S17, includes the road bypass around Lublin 
 first stage of Puławy bypass with the John Paul II bridge.  Opened in 2008.
 second stage of Puławy bypass to Kurów West, 11.8 km long, opened to traffic on August 22, 2018.
 Kurów West - Lublin Felin - 55 km long, opened in stages May 2013, September 2014 and October 2014. This section is co-signed with S17. 
 Lublin Felin – Piaski West - 13.8 km built by upgrading existing dual carriageway road, opened as expressway in July 2013. Co-signed with S17.
 Piaski West - Piaski East (bypass of Piaski) -  4.2 km bypass built in 2004. Co-signed with S17.

Future 
A document outlining the future development of transport infrastructure issued by the Polish government in August 2014 projected that the road would be fully completed in 2023.  The section forming the bypass of Chełm will probably be built first.

References 

Expressways in Poland